Esdalin Gorani (born in Kavajë) is a well-known Albanian stage dancer/choreographer who performs for Albania's largest national broadcaster, Top Channel. He began his career performing for Folkloric Ensemble's "Besa" under the guidance of Ibrahim Roçi.S.

References

Year of birth missing (living people)
Living people
Albanian male ballet dancers
Dancers from Kavajë